Selkirk Airport  is located  north of Selkirk, Manitoba, Canada.

See also
Selkirk Water Aerodrome

References

Registered aerodromes in Manitoba
Selkirk, Manitoba